Apame or APAME may refer to:

 APAME Electra, an electric-powered airplane
 Apame (concubine), of Darius I

See also
 Apama (disambiguation)
 Apamea (disambiguation)